The Lake Odessa Area Historical Society and Museum in downtown Lake Odessa, Michigan, is home to a variety of historical items pertaining to the Lake Odessa area including an impressive collection of artifacts from a German POW camp that existed near Lake Odessa area during World War II, a Pere Marquette Railroad Depot built in 1887, a restored Grand Trunk Caboose, various local historical displays, the Ionia County Genealogical Library, and the Hosford House.  Operations are determined by a board of directors but the historical society is solely managed by the president, John Waite.  The museum is a private, non-profit museum completely self-funded through various events and through philanthropists.

Depot building
Built in 1888, the depot was originally the property of the Detroit, Lansing and Northern Railroad and later the Pere Marquette Railroad, which was a merger of three Michigan-based railway systems beginning in the late 1800s.  Eventually this system become part of the C&O Railroad.  The depot served Lake Odessa for over 82 years until the last tickets were sold to passengers in 1971.  The building itself is not a large structure but it is important architecturally as it is the only Russian Ornate style building like this in the state of Michigan.  In 1987 the railroad sold the depot to the historical society.  The Depot consists of various rooms including a ticket office, a lobby which included both a ladies and a gentleman waiting rooms, and a baggage room.  An interesting exhibit in the depot is a device constructed in the 1920s by Clair Goodsell.  This periscope-like device would permit the user to peer into the water and see what they were dredging up.

Freight station building
Built in 2005 and reminiscent of the original freight station building, this building houses the main section of the museum.  The building is also home to the Ionia County Genealogy Society and has an extensive library housing a wealth of information for anyone interested in their family history in this area.

School room
A re-creation of a classroom from the original Lake Odessa High School is in the Freight Station building. The high school, originally built in 1888, burned down and was rebuilt in 1921.  This building was torn down in the 1990s but the historical society was able to retrieve several items from the building including the gymnasium scoreboard.  Also in this room is a library commemorating the Lake Odessa High School's Library, the Grace Nichol Library  - named in honor of a teacher who worked at the school.  The library consists of an extensive collection of school text books from the 1860s to the 1980s.

Native American history exhibit
Surrounded by three lakes - Jordan Lake, Tupper Lake, and Augst Lake, early Native Americans made their summer dwellings in this area.  Several tribes frequented the area including the Potowatomi, the Ottawa and the Ojibwe before white settlers arrived in the area around 1839.  The historical society has many artifacts, maps, descriptions of the Native Americans' lifestyle, traditions, and homes.

Bonanza exhibit
Bonanza was a small town that was a predecessor of Lake Odessa.  Started in the 1870s, Bonanza continued until the railroad was constructed and passed through the area that became known as Lake Odessa in 1888.  Lake Odessa was about a half-mile to the south of Bonanza, but its proximity to the railway made it the ideal location for commerce.  In order to be successful, merchants literally picked up their buildings and moved them into the town of Lake Odessa. The railroad's location and the development of the village of Lake Odessa put an end to the life of the town of Bonanza but laid a strong foundation for Lake Odessa when the businessmen of Bonanza moved to the meet the railroad.  Notable items: Cornerstone from the Bonanza School, rocking chair that was brought into Ionia County in the 1930s by the Dexter Family who settled in the area.

Farm exhibit
This exhibit depicts the area's early agricultural history and includes farming implements, tools, and engines of many types.  These numerous artifacts represent the methods of Lake Odessa area agriculture in its early years.  
Items of interest: Dairy display donated in 2007 by Bob McDowell, includes a cream separating machine, numerous milk bottles, and other items related to the dairy business.

Early Lake Odessa exhibit

This exhibit features businesses and displays artifacts from the important individuals who owned them.  The funeral home, established in 1888 and originally owned by George Weed and Stephen Haight, is one of Lake Odessa's oldest businesses.  Lake Odessa Canning Company, Smith Brothers Elevator, and other area businesses represent early area industries.  The pharmacy display includes a collection of medicine bottles and labels, and other pharmaceutical equipment.

Medical history exhibit
From the offices of Dr. Tromp and Dr. Hough, two local doctors at the time, there is a collection of furniture, medical equipment, X-ray machine, examination table, wheelchair, and various medical equipment used in the doctors’ offices from the 1940s–1980s.

Lake Odessa Wave Exhibit
Consisting of a desk and a safe, this small display is devoted to the local newspaper, published from 1888 to the 1980s.  Owners were the Dann Family who donated the items.

Prisoner of War Exhibit
From 1944 to 1945, a German POW camp was established in Lake Odessa to provide workers to the Lake Odessa Canning Company and the local farms. This exhibit is of both state and national importance.  Although other states in the United States may have remnants of POW camp buildings or other structures to exhibit, actual artifacts of a POW camp are rare.

In late 1944, five German POWs escaped from the camp and were recovered about 4 miles west of Lake Odessa.  After their capture, a POW hat was found by a young boy.  He then saved it and donated it a few years ago to the museum.

When the US Army dismantled the camp in 1945, a few remnants remained and were salvaged by area residents, including a POW identification tag found by a young boy who explored the camp area after it was closed.

Some notable items of interest in this display include a wooden mailbox, labeled Briefkasten (German for mailbox);  a letter sent from Fort Custer, the parent camp of this camp;  detailed information on Heinz Hanft – a former POW who returned to Europe after the war, and took his wife and family out of  Germany to settle in Holland, Michigan.  The family has provided a wealth of information concerning Heinz's imprisonment here.

Other notable exhibits

 A horse drawn mail wagon from 1903 when rural mail delivery first began in Lake Odessa.
 A 1964 Chrysler New Yorker originally owned by Allie Kluinsteker and donated by her family.
 Hosford House 1890s early Lake Odessa home currently under reconstruction.

Specialty displays and events
Rotated monthly, the museum hosts at least 12 specialty displays of events throughout the year.

 January: Quilt Show
 February: “It's Art” Show
 March: Toy Show
 April: Rummage Sale
 May: Military Tribute and Display
 June: LOHS Alumni Day & Ice Cream Social
 July: Depot Day
 November: Autumn Dinner, Christmas Memory Trees, & Christmas ‘Round the Town

References

External links 
 Lake Odessa
 Lake Odessa Historical Society Blog

Museums in Ionia County, Michigan
History museums in Michigan
Historical societies in Michigan